Christmas Sky is an album by Jordan Rudess recorded and released in 2002.

The album is recorded specifically for the Christmas season.  Featured on the album are piano and synthesizer improvisations based on classic Christmas songs, as well as one original piece written by Rudess for the Christmas season.

Track listing
"White Christmas" – 5:29
"God Rest Ye Merry Gentlemen" – 3:19
"Silent Night" – 3:56
"The Little Drummer Boy" – 3:22
"I Wonder When I Wander" – 4:31
"The Christmas Song" – 3:06
"O Holy Night" – 4:10
"What Child Is This" – 4:00
"It Came Upon a Midnight Clear" – 2:11
"The First Noel" – 4:06
"Andelusion" (Rudess) – 5:33

Personnel
Jordan Rudess - Piano, Keyboards

Jordan Rudess albums
2002 Christmas albums
Christmas albums by American artists